is a river in Shinhidaka, Hokkaidō, Japan. The Shizunai River drains from the Hidaka Mountains into the Pacific Ocean.

Etymology
The Shizunai River was known as Shibuchari and Shibechari.  This name was derived from Shipe-ichan, meaning "a salmon spawning place" in Ainu.

The name Shizunai is derived from the Ainu language and has three possible sources:
 Shiputnai – A marsh at the origin of the Ainu.
 Shuttonai – A marsh with many grapes.
 Shutnai – A river at the foot of a mountain.

Course
The Shizunai River flows generally southwest from its headwaters in the Hidaka mountains at the confluence of the Koikakushushibichari and Koibokushushibichari rivers. It flows into , a reservoir created by the Takami Dam. Past the dam, the Shizunai river flows into . Past the Shizunai Dam, the river encounters Futa Dam before leaving the mountains for the flood plain. The river flows past the outlying communities of Shizunai before entering the Pacific Ocean just northwest of Shizunai harbor.

Natural history
The Shizunai River was designated as a wildlife protection area in 1965. Whooper swans overwinter on the Shizunai River.

History
The Shizunai River basin was the home of the Ainu leader who led Shakushain's revolt against the Shogunate-era Yamato people, especially the Matsumae clan, in the 1660s. In the Edo period the region was used for gold mining.

Lists

List of bridges and dams
From river mouth to source:

List of (named) tributaries
From river mouth to source:
 Left — 
 Right — Perari River
 Left —  charcoal or coal mountain river
 Left — Shunbetsu River
 Right — Poyoppusawa River
 Right — Pisenaisawa River
 Left — Penkeonikemushi River
 Left — Ponpanbetsu Creek
 Left — Penkebetsusawa River
 Left — Porokaunnai River
 Right — Ibetsusawa River
 Right — Abeunnai River
 Confluence Left — Koibokushuchchari, Right — Koikakushuppichari

References

 Brett L. Walker, The Conquest of Ainu Lands, University of California Press, Berkeley, 2001, 
 Nippon-Kichi, 静内川　Shizunai-gawa　The Shizunai River, 12 July 2007, last access 26 May 2008

Rivers of Hokkaido
Rivers of Japan